The members of the 31st General Assembly of Newfoundland were elected in the Newfoundland general election held in October 1956. The general assembly sat from March 19, 1957, to July 28, 1959.

The Liberal Party led by Joey Smallwood formed the government.

John R. Courage served as speaker.

There were three sessions of the 31st General Assembly:

Sir Leonard Outerbridge served as lieutenant governor of Newfoundland until 1957. Campbell Leonard Macpherson succeeded Outerbridge as lieutenant governor.

Members of the Assembly 
The following members were elected to the assembly in 1956:

Notes:

By-elections 
By-elections were held to replace members for various reasons:

Notes:

References 

Terms of the General Assembly of Newfoundland and Labrador